The 1943 Belmont Stakes was the 75th running of the Belmont Stakes. It was the 37th Belmont Stakes held at Belmont Park in Elmont, New York and was held on June 5, 1943. With a field of three horses, heavily-favored Count Fleet, the winner of that year's Kentucky Derby and Preakness Stakes won the 1 –mile race (12 f; 2.4 km) by 25 lengths over Fairy Manhurst.

With the win, Count Fleet became the sixth U. S. Triple Crown champion.

Results

 Winning breeder: Fannie Hertz; (KY)

Payout

 Based on a $2 wager. No place or show wagers sold.

External links 
BelmontStakes.com

References

Belmont Stakes races
Belmont Stakes
Belmont Stakes
Belmont Stakes
Belmont Stakes